Scott Taylor (born August 22, 1991) is a darts player from Bolton, England. He plays in Professional Darts Corporation events.

career

2015

Taylor reached the quarter-finals of the 2015 PDC World Youth Championship and lost 6−5 to Dean Reynolds.

2016

He won the eighth Challenge Tour event of 2016 by beating Barry Lynn 5−4.

His first match win in a European Tour tournament came at the German Darts Championship when he defeated Andy Boulton 6−3. Taylor lost 6−1 to Alan Norris in the second round.

2017

Taylor won a two-year PDC Tour Card in January 2017 by defeating Antonio Alcinas 5−1 on the third day of Q-School.

2018

Taylor reached the final of players championship 9 losing to Michael van Gerwen 6–4, this run to the final granted him a spot in the 2018 Players Championship Finals where he lost in the first round to Ian White 6–2.

Taylor did not earn enough prize money between 2017–2018 to get himself into the world's top 64 which meant that he lost his tour card.

2019 and BDO debut

In 2019 Taylor re-entered Q-school but failed to come away with a tour card which meant he had to play on the challenge tour instead. He qualified for the 2019 UK Open through a Riley's bar amateur qualifier, he started in round one and won three games losing to Mickey Mansell 10–9 in the last 64.

Thanks to the new rule change in the British Darts Organisation that meant players could compete in challenge tour and BDO events without consequences, Taylor was able to enter into the 2019 BDO World Trophy qualifier. The qualifier was held the day before the event, Taylor won a place by making his way through the field and made his BDO major debut. He won his opening game 5–3 against number 15 seed Derk Telnekes he recorded an average of 104.6 which broke the record for highest ever average in the World Trophy. However the following day he played Jim Williams, the pair exchanged hold of throws to go 3-3 but Taylor missed three darts at double twenty to move 4–3 in front this was followed by another hold from Scott after surviving two darts missed for the match by Williams, who went onto beat Taylor 5–4. The match consisted of 9 holds of throw and an 83.1 average from Taylor who could not back up his form from the previous two days.

References

English darts players
Sportspeople from Bolton
1991 births
Living people
Professional Darts Corporation former tour card holders